The Willamette Valley flood of 1996 was part of a larger series of floods in the Pacific Northwest of the United States which took place between late January and mid-February 1996. It was Oregon's largest flood event in terms of fatalities and monetary damage during the 1990s. The floods spread beyond Oregon's Willamette Valley, extending west to the Oregon Coast and east toward the Cascade Mountains. Significant flood damage also impacted the American states of Washington, Idaho (particularly the north of the state) and California. The floods were directly responsible for eight deaths in Oregon, as well as over US$500 million in property damage throughout the Pacific Northwest. Three thousand residents were displaced from their homes.

Causes
An unusual confluence of weather events made the floods particularly severe. The winter preceding the floods had produced abnormally high rainfall and relatively low snowfall. The heavy rains saturated ground soil and raised river levels throughout January 1996. In late January, a heavy snowstorm padded snow packs throughout the region. This was followed by a deep freeze that lasted for six to ten days.  The new layer of snow was quickly melted by a warm subtropical jetstream which arrived on February 6. The jetstream brought along further rains.  The combination of the additional rain, the saturated ground, and the melting snow packs engorged dozens of streams and tributaries, which in turn flooded into the region's major rivers.

Impacts

The river came within inches of flowing over its seawall and flooding a large portion of Portland's downtown Tom McCall Waterfront Park. A major sandbagging effort involving civilians as well as the Oregon National Guard was launched throughout downtown Portland and was maintained until the floodwaters began to recede on February 9. At least five rivers in Oregon crested at all-time highs during the floods.

The downtown areas of Oregon City and Tillamook suffered particularly heavy damage from the floods, and both were submerged for several days. Several houses in SW Portland were also damaged by the heavy rainfall and a landslide caused one stretch of SW Fairmount Boulevard to be closed for several weeks.

References

External links 

 
 
 

1996 meteorology
1996 floods in the United States
Floods in the United States
Willamette River
Natural disasters in Oregon
Pacific Northwest storms
1996 in Oregon